The CASA 3000 was a proposed turboprop aircraft aimed at the regional airliner market. The project was proposed by Construcciones Aeronáuticas SA (CASA) during the early part of the 1990s.

CASA initially proposed that it would feature a fuselage based on that of the Russian Ilyushin Il-114, mated to a wing based on the Saab 2000's wing, which was being produced by CASA for Saab. CASA proposed that the fuselage of the Ilyushin Il-114 be stretched to allow for 70 passenger seats. Changes to the Il-114's fuselage design would also be made, necessary to conform to differing airworthiness regulations existing outside the Soviet Union.

After talks with Ilyushin broke down, CASA then announced the aircraft would feature a fuselage of its own design. Despite predicting a market for up to 1,000 aircraft of its class, CASA abandoned the project without any aircraft being built.

Specifications

See also

References

Abandoned civil aircraft projects